Amol Ramkrushna Mitkari (born 1982) is an Indian social activist, orator and politician belonging to the Nationalist Congress Party. He is member of Maharashtra Legislative Council and also served as member of Zilla Parishad. He got elected to the Legislative Council by MLA's unopposed on 24 May 2020, along with 9 others.

Personal life 

Amol Mitkari belongs to the Kutasa village, which falls in the middle of Amravati and Akola District. His father is a farmer and ran a grocery shop. He is married to Kavita Mitkari having one daughter named Apurva Mitkari. He has completed his graduation from Sant Gadge Baba Amravati University.

Political career 
Amol Mitkari started his career as a member of Sambhaji Brigade and was its spokesperson. He is now associated with the Nationalist Congress Party (NCP), as one of their top public speakers. He is state general secretary of NCP and was elected to the Maharashtra Legislative Council on 14 May 2020.

Positions held 
 Member of Maharashtra Legislative Council, 2020

References 

Living people
1980 births
Marathi people
Members of the Maharashtra Legislative Council
Indian social workers
Nationalist Congress Party politicians from Maharashtra
Sant Gadge Baba Amravati University